The Club Social y Deportivo Jalisco was a former  Mexican football team who played in the Primera Division Mexicana and Second Division Mexicana. The team played its games in the city of Guadalajara, Jalisco.

History
The team is founded in 1970, after Oro had economic problems, at the end of the season Mexico 70. Sugar entrepreneurs decided to buy the franchise and turned it into Club Social y Deportivo Jalisco.

The club played since its inception in Primera Division Mexicana for 10 years, since the 1970-71 season until its descent to Segunda Division Mexicana in the 1979-80 season.

In their debut season in 1970-71 they ended second place just 5 points below Toluca, who impeded them to reach the  final against América. In 1971-72 season they ended 9 points away from qualifying to the playoffs, and in 1972-73 a 6th place in their group began to reflect a sluggish performance of the players. From the 1973-74 season to 1975-76 season they were unable to pass mid-table and occupied the last positions on several occasions.

For the 1976-77 season they came up short by 7 points from reaching the playoffs. Similarly in the 1977-78 season they were short by 4 points of Tigres UANL who eventually become champions. In 1978-79 and 1979–80, their last two seasons, they ranked last in their group, which made them have to contest a relegation playoffs with the Unión de Curtidores. They lost by an aggregate score of 4-3 and the team was relegated to Segunda Division Mexicana.

In 1984 Club Social y Deportivo Jalisco made it to the final for promotion to the Primera Division Mexicana against Zacatepec, however lost 3-1 on aggregate. They would never reach another final in order to return to first division.

In 2008, the team resurges with the original name in order to participate in Liga de Talentos de la Segunda División.

Stadium
Club Social y Deportivo Jalisco always played in Estadio Jalisco, which belongs to the civil Clubs States of Jalisco with 25% of the shares, which were inherited with the purchase of the Oro , act that made them legal partner and part owner of the Estadio Jalisco.

References

Football clubs in Guadalajara, Jalisco